Simon M. Woods is a British entrepreneur and former record producer.  Woods was the manager for the band UB40 after having seen them play at a pub, and turned down two offers on their behalf to release under 2 Tone Records, opting to release "Food For Thought" through another label, Graduate, before setting up Dep International that recorded and released UB40 internationally with enormous success.  Woods left the band in 1983 and started his own label, to which he signed Swans Way.  Woods ran his own marketing company before being hired on by the Birmingham School of Acting, and founded the European Drama Network, a film production company which makes movies based on classic plays. Their first movie was The Mandrake Root; it was directed by Malachi Bogdanov and is based on a comedy written in 1512 by Niccolò Machiavelli. In a co-production with Warwick Business School he wrote and directed The Inferno Show presents Machiavelli The Prince of Comedy, a short comedy to celebrate the 500th anniversary of the writing of The Prince. Currently he is developing a movie, From Ithaca With Love The Odyssey, a modern version of Homer's The Odyssey set in the modern day but made in Ancient Greek and Latin, loosely based on a play of the same name he produced in 2006 with director Malachi Bogdanov as part of the New Generation Arts Festival.

References

Living people
1955 births